Vision Quest is a young adult novel by Terry Davis, published in 1979. In first-person, present-tense narrative, it tells the story of a few months in the life of Louden Swain, a high school wrestler in Spokane, Washington who is cutting weight and working toward the state championships. The book takes its title from the vision quest ritual of some Native American tribes, of going into the wilderness alone to 'discover who you are and who your people are and how you fit into the circle of birth and growth and death and rebirth.'  John Irving called it "the truest novel about growing up since The Catcher in the Rye."

Vision Quest was made into a 1985 film of the same title, starring Matthew Modine and Linda Fiorentino, with a cameo appearance from Madonna as a night-club singer.

The book has been published in many different editions, including re-releases in May 2002 (with a foreword by Chris Crutcher) and May 2005.

Critical reception
Kirkus Reviews called Vision Quest "a sunny and deft novel for lovers of wrestling, wit, and hang-loose talent."

Awards and nominations
Vision Quest - ALA Best Books for Young Adults, 1980
Vision Quest - New York Public Library Best Books for the Teen Age, 1980
Vision Quest - ALA Best Books for Young Adults In the Last Quarter Century, 1995

References

External links
 Terry Davis's site
 Cover art and movie stills

1979 American novels
Novels set in Washington (state)
American young adult novels
American novels adapted into films
Spokane, Washington
Delacorte Press books